The 12th edition of  was the last edition of  to be overseen by its author, Carl Linnaeus. It was published by Laurentius Salvius in Holmiæ (Stockholm) in three volumes, with parts appearing from 1766 to 1768. It contains many species not covered in the previous edition, the 10th edition which was the starting point for zoological nomenclature.

Starting point
It was later replaced by the 10th edition as the starting point for most zoological nomenclature. The starting point for most names in botanical nomenclature is the 1753 work .

Format
Linnaeus divided the 12th edition into three volumes, the first of which was published in two parts. Volume 1 covered  – the animal kingdom – with the first 532 pages appearing as Part 1 in 1766, and pages 533–1327 appearing as Part 2 in 1767. Volume 2 covered  – the plant kingdom; it comprised 736 pages and appeared in 1767, with an additional 142-page . Volume 3 covered  – the mineral kingdom – and appendices to all three volumes; it comprised 236 pages and was published in 1768. Including appendices, front matter and back matter, the three volumes cover around 2,400 pages.

Novelties
Many species were included in the 12th edition which had not been included in earlier editions. For example, Linnaeus had included 700 species of mollusc in the 10th edition, and added a further 100 species for the 12th edition. Similarly, the number of bird species in the 12th edition was twice the number in the 10th edition. Sponges were included in the 12th edition, in the class "Zoophyta", having been omitted from previous editions.

References

1766 books
1767 books
1768 books
Systema Naturae